Henri Picard, sometimes credited as Henri Richer-Picard, is a Canadian actor from Quebec. He is most noted for his supporting role as Marc in the film For Those Who Don't Read Me (À tous ceux qui ne me lisent pas), for which he was a Prix Iris nominee for Best Supporting Actor at the 21st Quebec Cinema Awards in 2019.

The son of actors Luc Picard and Isabel Richer, he has also appeared in the television series Trauma, Jenny, Cerebrum, District 31, Chaos and Toute la vie, and the films Audition (L'Audition), Ésimésac, Cross My Heart (Les Rois mongols), My Boy (Mon Boy), Mafia Inc. and Maria Chapdelaine.

References

External links

21st-century Canadian male actors
Canadian male film actors
Canadian male television actors
Canadian male child actors
Male actors from Quebec
Living people
French Quebecers
Year of birth missing (living people)